Narabayashi (written: 楢林 lit. "oak forest" or 奈良林) is a Japanese surname. Notable people with the surname include:

, Japanese footballer
, Japanese neurosurgeon

Japanese-language surnames